Joseph Anthony Kloska (born 1983) is an English actor. He began his career in radio, moving on to work in television, theatre, and film.

Life
Named after a Polish grandfather, Teofil Joseph Kloska, who had settled in England, Kloska was brought up in Cornwall. As a child, he was taken to see a grisly outdoor production of Macbeth on Bodmin Moor, which made a great impression on him. After leaving Sir James Smith's Comprehensive School in Camelford, he attended University College London to read History and French, before training for an acting career at the Royal Academy of Dramatic Art, where he was in the same year group as Pip Carter, Kathy Rose O'Brien, Arthur Darvill, Sia Berkeley, Harry Hepple, Nathaniel Martello-White, and Danielle Ryan. He graduated in 2006.

His first career move was to join the BBC Radio Drama Company, for which he auditioned when about to leave RADA, winning the Carlton Hobbs Bursary and gaining a contract for five months' work which began a few days after the end of term. He has called this one of the best opportunities of his career, leading to work on many radio productions and introducing him to "the slightly weird world of working as an actor".

From extensive work in radio, Kloska went on to gain supporting roles in theatre and television and also cameo appearances in films.

In a Royal Shakespeare Company production of Imperium in 2017–2018, Kloska played the slave-narrator Tiro, with one reviewer commenting on his "irrepressible wit and verve".

Theatre
This list is not complete
The Vertical Hour (Royal Court Theatre, 2008), as Dennis Dutton
Fast Labour (Hampstead Theatre, 2008), as Andrius
Written on the Heart (Royal Shakespeare Company, Swan Theatre, (2011–2012) as Samuel Ward
Imperium (Royal Shakespeare Company, Swan Theatre, 2017–2018), as Marcus Tullius Tiro

Television
The Bill: Rough Justice (2007), as Andrew Stroud
Lark Rise to Candleford (2008), as Young Footman
Foyle's War, The Hide and The Russian House (2010), as DC Perkins
The Rise of the Nazi Party (2013), narrator
Jo: Invalides (2013) Dr Parent
The Crown (2016), as Henry Herbert, 7th Earl of Carnarvon
Pete versus Life (2010–2011), as Rob

Films
Happy-Go-Lucky (2008) as Suzy's boyfriend
Made in Dagenham (2010), as Undersecretary 1
Blooded (2011) as Ben Fitzpatrick
Jane Eyre (2011) as Wood, clergyman at wedding
The Riot Club (2014) as Ruby Wedding Man
Cinderella (2015) as Royal Crier's Assistant
 The Little Vampire 3D (2017) as Maney
Peterloo (2018) as Richard Carlile

Radio
This list is not complete

King Lear (BBC World Service, recorded at the Globe Theatre, 2006)
The Brothers Karamazov (BBC Radio 4, 2006)
Tomorrow, Today! (BBC Radio 4, 2006–2008), as Hugo Kellerman
Peter Pan in Scarlet (BBC Radio 4, 2006), as Tootles
The Midnight Folk (BBC Radio 4, 2006)
Number 10 (BBC Radio 4 drama series), as Ollie Armstrong
Oneira (BBC Radio 4 Extra, 2007)
Caesar! (2007 series), as Crispus
The Pattern of Painful Adventures (BBC Radio 3 play, 2008), as Edmund Shakespeare
Howards End (BBC Radio 4, 2009), as Charles Wilcox
Towards Zero (BBC Radio 4, 2010), as Latimer
The First Domino (BBC Radio 3, 2010)
Blake's 7: The Liberator Chronicles (2011), as Cullen
I, Claudius (BBC Radio 4, 2010)
The Acheron Pulse (2012), as Dukhin
The Masters of Luxor (Big Finish Productions, 2012)
Pilgrim (BBC Radio 4, 2016), as Mr Hibbens

Notes

External links
Joseph Kloska at IMDb.com
Joseph Kloska showreel 2016 at IMDb.com
Joseph Kloska at Independent Talent
Joseph Kloska on Twitter

1983 births
English people of Polish descent
English television actors
Living people
Male actors from Cornwall